Luis Horna was the defending champion, but lost in the second round to Carlos Berlocq.

Fernando González won with a walkover, after Juan Mónaco withdrew from the final due to a left ankle injury.

Seeds

Draw

Finals

Top half

Bottom half

Qualifying

Seeds

Qualifiers

Qualifying draw

First qualifier

Second qualifier

Third qualifier

Fourth qualifier

External links
 Main draw
 Qualifying draw

Singles